Leonard Tsosie (born August 19, 1955) is an American politician who served in the New Mexico Senate from the 22nd district from 1993 to 2007.

References

1955 births
Living people
Navajo people
Democratic Party New Mexico state senators
20th-century Native Americans
21st-century Native Americans